Charlene Marie Richard (January 13, 1947 – August 11, 1959) was a twelve-year-old Roman Catholic Cajun girl from Richard, Louisiana, in the United States. She has become the focus of a popular belief that she is a saint—a person who is in heaven—who has performed a number of miracles. Local Catholic
clergy and diocesan officials permitted, promoted, and participated in the popular veneration of Richard for years prior to her being named a Servant of God, the first step in the canonization process.

Life and final illness

Charlene was the second-oldest of ten children born to Joseph Elvin and Mary Alice Richard. Adults and children who knew her considered her to be smart but otherwise unremarkable. She was a devout Catholic but no more so than was customary in the local Cajun community. Richard's mother said, "She liked sports and was always busy with something. She went to church and said her rosary, but she was just a normal little girl." In May 1959, after reading a book about Therese of Lisieux Richard asked her grandmother whether she, too, could become a saint by praying like Therese.

After reporting appearances of a tall woman in black who vanishes, and her teacher recommending that she was not herself, her mother took her to a physician. As a result, only two weeks before her death she was diagnosed with acute lymphatic leukemia and hospitalized at Our Lady of Lourdes Hospital in Lafayette, Louisiana. At the request of her family, she was informed by the hospital chaplain, Joseph Brennan, a newly ordained Catholic priest, that she was going to die. Brennan introduced her to the Catholic doctrine of redemptive suffering. Though the illness was painful, she remained cheerful, meekly accepted her fate, and offered up her suffering to God. Brennan was deeply impressed by her faith and visited her daily. While dying, Richard prayed for other individuals to be healed or to be converted to Catholicism. The Director of Pediatrics at the hospital, Theresita Crowley, a nun, also witnessed her calm acceptance of suffering and prayers for others. Brennan and Crowley claimed that those for whom Richard prayed recovered from their illnesses or became Catholic. Richard died on 11 August 1959 and was buried in Richard, Louisiana.

Belief in Richard as saint

Before her death, Brennan and Crowley began telling people about Richard, and Richard's family became aware that there was a belief that she was "special." Floyd Calais, a Catholic priest who was at the time the chaplain of Charity Hospital in Lafayette, was a close friend of Brennan. In 1961, Calais began praying to Richard to be assigned to a parish. He was assigned to St. Edwards parish in Richard, Louisiana—Richard's burial place—that same year. Once there, he discovered the need to raise money to build a new church there. Calais says that he was "invited to retreats and recollections, and began speaking about Charlene, how she achieved grace before she died" and about the need for money to build a new church in the parish. "People started going to her grave," he said, "and began sending checks to build the church. What I thought would take 8–10 years took 2 1/2."

As early as the late 1960s and by 1972 at the latest, prayer cards marked "For Private Devotion only" with a photograph of Richard, a prayer to her, and a prayer for her canonization were in circulation and xerographic copies were frequently being sent to individuals in need of help. A 1975 series of articles about Richard in the newspaper of the Lafayette diocese spread the cult and were republished in a booklet, "Charlene, A Saint from Southwest Louisiana", in 1979. Testimonials by individuals who believed that they had benefited by prayer to Richard were added and the booklet was again republished in 1988. A widespread belief formed in the area that Richard would intercede in heaven for people's prayers to be answered.

By 1989, the belief had spread outside the Cajun area. Hundreds of people were visiting Richard's grave each week, which had been illuminated so visits could occur in the evening and a box had been provided in which to leave written petitions to Richard. On the thirtieth anniversary of her death that year, an outdoor Mass was held there which was attended by four thousand people and which was covered by Louisiana television stations and the Cable News Network, and was reported in newspapers in Louisiana, Dallas, Houston, Miami, Orlando, Albany, and Seattle. The media coverage resulted in knowledge of Richard spreading world-wide, with interest in her expressed in Yugoslavia, Croatia, Australia, and Africa. Approximately a thousand people attended anniversary Masses there in both 1991 and 1999, with about 400 attending in 2007, and thousands come to her grave each year, including chartered buses from New Orleans.

Church position

Though no official canonization procedures had begun for Richard, the Roman Catholic Diocese of Lafayette began collecting in 1991 testimonials about reputed help obtained through her. Unlike the traditional support for canonization of a saint, which begins with popular devotion and is only later recognized by the church, support for Richard began outside her immediate home area and was first promoted by the clergy, beginning with Brennan, Crowley, and Calais. The bishop of the Lafayette diocese at the time of her death, Maurice Schexnayder, visited her grave multiple times and referred to her as a saint. Another bishop of the diocese, Harry Flynn, presided at the thirtieth anniversary Mass in 1989, along with sixteen other priests. The diocese also approved the creation of a private organization, the Friends of Charlene, to spread her story.

In January 2020, Bishop J. Douglas Deshotel of the Diocese of Lafayette officially opened the cause of Richard’s sainthood during a Saturday Mass at the Immaculata Center in Lafayette, along with Arnaudville teacher and evangelist Auguste Nonco Pelafigue. Following the Mass, Richard and Pelafigue were officially named “Servant of God”, the first step in sainthood.

On 17 November 2021, the USCCB meeting in Baltimore, Maryland voted to advance the cause of Charlene's beatification and canonization.

See also
Folk saint

Notes

References

1947 births
1959 deaths
Deaths from leukemia
Folk saints
Christian child saints
Cajun people
People from St. Mary Parish, Louisiana
American Servants of God